This is a list of elections held in 2012 in the U.S. state of Indiana:

 United States presidential election in Indiana, 2012
 United States Senate election in Indiana, 2012
 United States House of Representatives elections in Indiana, 2012
 Indiana gubernatorial election, 2012

External links 
Indiana Election Division
Indiana at Ballotpedia
Indiana judicial elections, 2012 at Ballotpedia
Indiana 2012 campaign finance data from OpenSecrets
Indiana Congressional Races in 2012 campaign finance data from OpenSecrets
Outside spending at the Sunlight Foundation

 
Indiana